Langsdorff may refer to:

People
 Grigory Langsdorff (1774–1852), German-Russian naturalist, explorer, and physician, and Russian diplomat
 Hans Langsdorff (1894–1939), German naval officer, commanding officer of Admiral Graf Spee in the Battle of the River Plate
 Karl Christian von Langsdorf (1757–1834), German mathematician, geologist, natural scientist, and engineer

Other
 Langsdorff's toucanet, an alternative name for the golden-collared toucanet